The 2003 Miller Lite Hall of Fame Championships was a tennis tournament played on grass courts at the International Tennis Hall of Fame in Newport, Rhode Island in the United States and was part of the International Series of the 2003 ATP Tour. The tournament ran from July 7 through July 13, 2003.

Finals

Singles

 Robby Ginepri defeated  Jürgen Melzer 6–4, 6–7(3–7), 6–1
 It was Ginepri's only title of the year and the 1st of his career.

Doubles

 Jordan Kerr /  David Macpherson defeated  Julian Knowle /  Jürgen Melzer 7–6(7–4), 6–3
 It was Kerr's only title of the year and the 1st of his career. It was Macpherson's only title of the year and the 16th of his career.

References

External links
 
 ATP tournament profile

Miller Lite Hall of Fame Championships
Hall of Fame Open
Miller Lite Hall of Fame Championships
Miller Lite Hall of Fame Championships
Miller Lite Hall of Fame Championships